Christoper Rhys Jones (born 27 May 1982 in St. Helens) is an English former rugby union and rugby league footballer who played in the 2000s.

Jones' position of choice in rugby union was as a centre but he could also operate on the wing.

He used to play for Sale Sharks and Leeds Tykes in the Guinness Premiership. He was contracted to St. Helens and played for the Leigh Centurions in the Super League.

In 2007, Jones was forced to retire after a shoulder injury going on to become coach of North East One side Old Crossleyans RUFC.

References

External links
Leeds profile
Sale profile
Guinness Premiership page

1982 births
Living people
English rugby league players
English rugby union players
Footballers who switched code
Leeds Tykes players
Leigh Leopards players
Rugby league centres
Rugby league players from St Helens, Merseyside
Rugby union centres
Rugby union players from St Helens, Merseyside
Sale Sharks players
St Helens R.F.C. players